A waffle is a dish made from leavened batter or dough that is cooked between two plates that are patterned to give a characteristic size, shape, and surface impression. There are many variations based on the type of waffle iron and recipe used. Waffles are eaten throughout the world, particularly in Belgium, which has over a dozen regional varieties.  Waffles may be made fresh or simply heated after having been commercially cooked and frozen.

Etymology
The word waffle first appears in the English language in 1725: "Waffles. Take flower, cream..." It is directly derived from the Dutch , which itself derives from the Middle Dutch .

While the Middle Dutch  is first attested to at the end of the 13th century, it is preceded by the French  in 1185; both from Frankish  'honeycomb' or 'cake'.

Other spellings throughout modern and medieval Europe include waffe, wafre, wafer, wâfel, waufre, iauffe, gaufre, goffre, gauffre, wafe, waffel, wåfe, wāfel, wafe, vaffel, and våffla.

History

Medieval origins
In ancient times the Greeks cooked flat cakes, called , between hot metal plates. As they were spread throughout medieval Europe, the cake mix, a mixture of flour, water or milk, and often eggs, became known as wafers and were also cooked over an open fire between iron plates with long handles.

While the communion wafer irons typically depicted imagery of Jesus and his crucifixion, the  featured more trivial Biblical scenes or simple, emblematic designs. The format of the iron itself was almost always round and considerably larger than those used for communion.

The oublie was, in its basic form, composed only of grain flour and water – just as was the communion wafer. It took until the 11th century, as a product of The Crusades bringing new culinary ingredients to Western Europe, for flavorings such as orange blossom water to be added to the oublies; however, locally sourced honey and other flavorings may have already been in use before that time.

Oublies, not formally named as such until , spread throughout northwestern continental Europe, eventually leading to the formation of the  guild in 1270. These oublieurs/obloyers were responsible for not only producing the oublies but also for a number of other contemporaneous and subsequent  (light pastries), including the waffles that were soon to arise.

14th–16th centuries
In the late 14th century, the first known waffle recipe was penned in an anonymous manuscript, written by a husband as a set of instructions to his young wife. While it technically contains four recipes, all are a variation of the first: Beat some eggs in a bowl, season with salt and add wine. Toss in some flour, and mix. Then fill, little by little, two irons at a time with as much of the paste as a slice of cheese is large. Then close the iron and cook both sides. If the dough does not detach easily from the iron, coat it first with a piece of cloth that has been soaked in oil or grease. The other three variations explain how cheese is to be placed in between two layers of batter, grated and mixed in to the batter, or left out, along with the eggs. However, this was a waffle /  in name only, as the recipe contained no leavening.

Though some have speculated that waffle irons first appeared in the 13th–14th centuries, it was not until the 15th century that a true physical distinction between the oublie and the waffle began to evolve. It was also in this period that the waffle's classic grid motif appeared clearly in a French  and a Belgian   – albeit in a more shallowly engraved fashion –  setting the stage for the more deeply gridded irons that were about to become commonplace throughout Belgium.

Bruegel's work, in particular, not only shows waffles being cooked, but fine detail of individual waffles. In those instances, the waffle pattern can be counted as a large 12x7 grid, with cleanly squared sides, suggesting the use of a fairly thin batter, akin to contemporary Brussels waffles.

For the first time, partial measurements were given, sugar was used, and spices were added directly to the batter: Take grated white bread. Take with that the yolk of an egg and a spoonful of pot sugar or powdered sugar. Take with that half water and half wine, and ginger and cinnamon.

Alternately attributed to the 16th and 17th centuries,  from the Belgian  was published as the first recipe to use leavening (beer yeast): Take white flour, warm cream, fresh melted butter, yeast, and mix together until the flour is no longer visible. Then add ten or twelve egg yolks. Those who do not want them to be too expensive may also add the egg white and just milk. Put the resulting dough at the fireplace for four hours to let it rise better before baking it. Until this time, no recipes contained leavening and could therefore be easily cooked in the thin .

By the mid-16th century, there were signs of waffles' mounting French popularity.  I, king from 1494 to 1547, of whom it was said  (loved them a lot), had a set of waffle irons cast in pure silver. His successor,  enacted the first waffle legislation in 1560, in response to a series of quarrels and fights that had been breaking out between the oublieurs. They were required "" (to be no less than 4 yards from one to the other).

17th–18th centuries
Moving into the 17th century, unsweetened or honey-sweetened waffles and oublies – often made of non-wheat grains – were the type generally accessible to the average citizen. The wheat-based and particularly the sugar-sweetened varieties, while present throughout Europe, were prohibitively expensive for all but the monarchy and bourgeoisie. Even for the Dutch, who controlled much of the mid-century sugar trade, a kilogram of sugar was worth ½ an ounce of silver (the equivalent of ~$7 for a 5 lb. bag, 01/2016 spot silver prices), while, elsewhere in Europe, it fetched twice the price of opium. One serves them at the table like dessert pastry."

By the dawn of the 18th century, expansion of Caribbean plantations had cut sugar prices in half. Waffle recipes abounded and were becoming decadent in their use of sugar and other rare ingredients. For instance, Menon's  from  included a livre of sugar for a demi-livre of flour.

At the same time, the French introduced whipped egg whites to waffles, along with lemon zests, Spanish wine, and cloves. Joseph Gillier even published the first chocolate waffle recipe, featuring three ounces of chocolate grated and mixed into the batter, before cooking.

A number of the 18th century waffle recipes took on names to designate their country or region/city of origin – ,  and, most famous of all the 18th century varieties, which were first recorded in 1740. These  (Flemish waffles / ) were the first French recipe to use beer yeast, but unlike the Dutch and German yeasted recipes that preceded them, use only egg whites and over a pound of butter in each batch. They are also the oldest named recipe that survives in popular use to the present day, produced regionally and commercially by Meert.

The 18th century is also when the word "waffle" first appeared in the English language, in a 1725 printing of Court Cookery by Robert Smith. Recipes had begun to spread throughout England and America, though essentially all were patterned after established Dutch, Belgian, German, and French versions. Waffle parties, known as "wafel frolics", were documented as early as 1744 in New Jersey, and the Dutch had earlier established waffles in New Amsterdam (New York City).

However, there are no German, French, Dutch, or Belgian cookbooks that contain references to them in this period – by any name – nor are there any waffle recipes that mention the  waffle's distinctive ingredients, brioche-based dough and pearl sugar. , the famous Parisian pastry chef, is the first to incorporate  into several waffle variations named in his 1822 work, . A full  recipe does not appear until 1921.

19th–21st centuries

Waffles remained widely popular in Europe for the first half of the 19th century, despite the 1806 British Atlantic naval blockade that greatly inflated the price of sugar. This coincided with the commercial production of beet sugar in continental Europe, which, in a matter of decades, had brought the price down to historical lows. Within the transitional period from cane to beet sugar, Florian Dacher formalized a recipe for the Brussels Waffle, the predecessor to American "Belgian" waffles, recording the recipe in 1842/43.  (Dutch syrup wafels), too, rose to prominence in the Netherlands by the middle of the century. However, by the second half of the 1800s, inexpensive beet sugar became widely available, and a wide range of pastries, candies and chocolates were now accessible to the middle class, as never before; waffles' popularity declined rapidly.

By the early 20th century, waffle recipes became rare in recipe books, and only 29 professional waffle craftsmen, the oublieurs, remained in Paris. Waffles were shifting from a predominantly street-vendor-based product to an increasingly homemade product, aided by the 1918 introduction of GE's first electric commercial waffle maker. By the mid-1930s, dry pancake/waffle mix had been marketed by a number of companies, including Aunt Jemima, Bisquick, and a team of three brothers from San Jose, Calif. – the Dorsas. It is the Dorsas who would go on to innovate commercial production of frozen waffles, which they began selling under the name "Eggo" in 1953. Manufacturers are now testing the production of waffles with potato starch, which increase the stability of the waffle and protect them from sticking to the iron.

Belgian-style waffles were showcased at Expo 58 in Brussels. Another Belgian introduced Belgian-style waffles to the United States at the 1962 Seattle World's Fair, but only really took hold at the 1964 New York World's Fair, when another Belgian entrepreneur introduced his "Bel-Gem" waffles. In practice, contemporary American "Belgian waffles" are actually a hybrid of pre-existing American waffle types and ingredients and some attributes of the Belgian model.

Even as most of the original recipes have faded from use, a number of the 18th and 19th century varieties can still be easily found throughout Northern Europe, where they were first developed.

Varieties

Brussels
Brussels waffles are prepared with an egg-white-leavened or yeast-leavened batter, traditionally an ale yeast; occasionally both types of leavening are used together. They are lighter, crisper and have larger pockets compared to other European waffle varieties, and are easy to differentiate from Liège Waffles by their rectangular sides. In Belgium, most waffles are served warm by street vendors and dusted with confectioner's sugar, though in tourist areas they might be topped with whipped cream, soft fruit or chocolate spread. 

Variants of the Brussels waffles – with whipped and folded egg whites cooked in large rectangular forms – date from the 18th century. However, the oldest recognized reference to "Gaufres de Bruxelles" (Brussels Waffles) by name is attributed from 1842/43 to Florian Dacher, a Swiss baker in Ghent, Belgium, who had previously worked under pastry chefs in central Brussels. Philippe Cauderlier would later publish Dacher's recipe in the 1874 edition of his recipe book "La Pâtisserie et la Confiture". Maximilien Consael, another Ghent chef, had claimed to have invented the waffles in 1839, though there's no written record of him either naming or selling the waffles until his participation in the 1856 Brussels Fair. Neither man created the recipe; they simply popularized and formalized an existing recipe as the Brussels waffle.

Liège
The Liège waffle is a richer, denser, sweeter, and chewier waffle. Native to the greater Wallonia region of Eastern Belgium – and alternately known as gaufres de chasse (hunting waffles) – they are an adaptation of brioche bread dough, featuring chunks of pearl sugar which caramelize on the outside of the waffle when baked. It is the most common type of waffle available in Belgium and prepared in plain, vanilla and cinnamon varieties by street vendors across the nation. In the United States, they are best known for being sold at ski resorts, mostly in the Northeast, under the Waffle Cabin brand.

Flemish
Flemish waffles, or Gaufres à la Flamande, are a specialty of northern France and portions of western Belgium. The original recipe, published in 1740 by Louis-Auguste de Bourbon in Le Cuisinier Gascon, is as follows: Take "deux litrons" (1.7 liters or 7 cups) of flour and mix it in a bowl with salt and one ounce of brewer's yeast barm. Moisten it completely with warm milk. Then whisk fifteen egg whites and add that to the mixture, stirring continuously. Incorporate "un livre" (490 grams or 1.1 pounds) of fresh butter, and let the batter rise. Once the batter has risen, take your heated iron, made expressly for these waffles, and wrap some butter in a cloth and rub both sides of the iron with it. When the iron is completely heated, make your waffles, but do so gently for fear of burning them. Cooked, take them out, put them on a platter, and serve them with both sugar and orange blossom water on top.

American
American waffles vary significantly. Generally denser and thinner than the Belgian waffle, they are often made from a batter leavened with baking powder, which is sometimes mixed with pecans, chocolate drops or berries and may be round, square, or rectangular in shape. Like American pancakes they are usually served as a sweet breakfast food, topped with butter and maple syrup, bacon, and other fruit syrups, honey, or powdered sugar. They are also found in many different savory dishes, such as fried chicken and waffles or topped with kidney stew. They may also be served as desserts, topped with ice cream and various other toppings. A large chain (over 1,900 locations) of waffle specialty diners, Waffle House, is ubiquitous in the southern United States.

Belgian
Belgian waffles are a North American waffle variety, based on a simplified version of the Brussels waffle. Recipes are typically baking soda leavened, though some are yeast-raised. They are distinguished from standard American waffles by their use of 1 ½" depth irons. Belgian waffles take their name from the Bel-Gem brand, which was promoted by waffle vendor Maurice Vermersch, who came from Brussels, Belgium. The thicker style was also popularized at the 1964 New York World's Fair.

Bergische
Bergische waffles, or Waffles from Berg county, are a specialty of the German region of Bergisches Land. The waffles are crisp and less dense than Belgian waffles, always heart shaped, and served with cherries, cream and optionally rice pudding as part of the traditional afternoon feast on Sundays in the region.

Hong Kong
Hong Kong style waffle, in Hong Kong called a "grid cake" or "grid biscuits" (格仔餅), is a waffle usually made and sold by street hawkers and eaten warm on the street. It is similar to a traditional waffle but larger, round in shape and divided into four quarters. It is usually served as a snack. Butter, peanut butter and sugar are spread on one side of the cooked waffle, and then it is folded into a semicircle to eat. Eggs, sugar and evaporated milk are used in the waffle recipes, giving them a sweet flavor. They are generally soft and not dense. Traditional Hong Kong style waffles are full of the flavor of yolk. Sometimes different flavors, such as chocolate and honey melon, are used in the recipe and create various colors. Another style of Hong Kong waffle is the eggette or gai daan jai (鷄蛋仔), which have a ball-shaped pattern.

Pandan
Pandan waffles originate from Vietnam and are characterized by the use of pandan flavoring and coconut milk in the batter. The pandan flavoring results in the batter's distinctive spring green color. When cooked, the waffle browns and crisps on the outside and stays green and chewy on the inside. Unlike most waffles, pandan waffles are typically eaten plain. In Vietnam they are relatively cheap and so are popular among children. They are a popular street food made in either cast iron molds heated with charcoal or in electric waffle irons.

Croffle
Croffle (a compound word of croissant and waffle) is a dessert where croissant raw paper is baked in a waffle pan and eaten with ice cream or maple syrup. The chewy taste of the waffles makes it fun to eat them like a croissant. It is a popular dessert in Korea. On the Internet, jokes about "the greatest invention of the Covid-19 Age" spread. There are various types of croffles that utilize various toppings such as basil, corn, cheese and so on. It is also popular with people because it is easy to make and eat at home. The beginning of Croffle is the cafe “Le Petit Parisian” in Dublin, Ireland. According to the Irish newspaper Dublin Gadget (reported on July 20, 2017), Louise Lenox, a baker at the café in Camden Street, Dublin, first created a menu item called Croffle.

Kue gapit
Kue gapit is an Indonesian kue kering (dry snack) which originates from West Java. Generally made from tapioca flour, its name comes from the cooking process, in which it is grilled between iron molds like a waffle. The snack comes in a variety of shapes and flavors.

Scandinavian
Scandinavian style waffles, common throughout the Nordic countries, are thin and made in a round waffle iron. The batter is similar to other varieties, but does not contain sugar. The most common style are heart-shaped slices with a sweet topping such as cream or jam.

 In Norway, brunost and gomme are also popular toppings. As with crèpes, there are those who prefer a salted style with various mixes, such as blue cheese.
 In Finland, savory toppings are uncommon; instead jam, sugar, whipped cream or vanilla ice cream are usually used.
 In Iceland, the traditional topping is either rhubarb or blueberry jam with whipped cream on top. Syrup and chocolate spread are also popular substitutes for the jam.
 The Swedish tradition dates at least to the 15th century, and there is even a particular day for the purpose, Våffeldagen (waffle day), which sounds like Vårfrudagen ("Our Lady's Day"), and is therefore used for the purpose. This is March 25 (nine months before Christmas), the Christian holiday of Annunciation. They are usually topped with strawberry jam, bilberry jam, cloudberry jam, raspberry jam, bilberry and raspberry jam, sugar and butter, vanilla ice cream and whipped cream. Other, savory, toppings include salmon roe, cold-smoked salmon and cream fraiche.

Gofri
Gofri (singular gofre) are waffles in Italy and can be found in the Piedmontese cuisine: they are light and crispy in texture, contain no egg or milk (according to the most ancient recipe) and come both in sweet and savory versions. Central Italian cuisine also features waffle-like cookies, which are locally known as pizzelle, ferratelle (in Abruzzo) or cancelle (in Molise).

Stroopwafel
Stroopwafels are thin waffles with a syrup filling, which originated from the Dutch city of Gouda. The stiff batter for the waffles is made from flour, butter, brown sugar, yeast, milk, and eggs. Medium-sized balls of batter are put on the waffle iron. When the waffle is baked and while it is still warm, it is cut into two halves. The warm filling made from syrup is spread in between the waffle halves, which glues them together. They are popular in the Netherlands and Belgium and sold in pre-prepared packages in shops and markets.

Galettes
Galettes campinoises/Kempense galetten are a type of waffle popular in Belgium. They are rigid and crunchy, but are buttery, crumbly and soft in the mouth.

Hotdog

Hotdog waffles (or waffle dogs) are cylindrical waffles with a hot dog cooked inside them, similar to a corn dog. It is made with specialized waffle irons with cylindrical hotdog-bun shaped molds.

They originate from Hawaii where it was first served at the KC Drive Inn in 1934, owned by the Japanese American Jiro Asato (who later legally changed his name to KC Jiro Asato). The original version has a distinctive shape, with an oblong middle section (containing the hotdog) surrounded by flattened square edges. It is served plain or with a combination of ketchup, mustard, and pickle relish. Its popularity spread to the continental United States, the Philippines (then an American colony), and throughout the rest of the Pacific Islands. Waffle dogs remain an iconic part of Hawaiian culture, though it has waned in popularity in the rest of the US. 

It has also remained popular as a street food item in the Philippines, where variants can use other savory fillings like ham, bacon, longganisa, tuna, or cheese; as well as sweet fillings like ube, chocolate, or yema custard. The Filipino versions are also more uniformly cylindrical, with a grid pattern, and are usually served on bamboo skewers. The Filipino fast food chain Waffle Time, founded in 1998, specializes in hotdog waffles as well as other savory and sweet fillings.

In modern times, it has also gained popularity in Thailand and the rest of Southeast Asia, where it is served with ketchup, mayonnaise, or both.

On a stick
Waffles on a stick are long waffles cooked onto a stick, usually dipped in something like chocolate syrup, and with sprinkles on top.

Toppings
Waffles can be eaten plain (especially the thinner kinds) or eaten with various toppings, such as:
 butter
 chocolate chips
 apple butter
 dulce de leche
 fruits:
 bananas
 blueberries
 boysenberries
 raspberries
 blackberries
 strawberries
 honey
 jam or jelly
 chocolate spread
 peanut butter
 syrup:
 maple syrup
 chocolate syrup
 caramel
 flavored syrups
 whipped cream
 powdered sugar

Ice cream cones are also a type of waffles or wafers.

Waffles are also eaten with savory rather than sweet toppings.

Consistency

On the industrial scale, waffles are baked at 140–180 °C for 110 and 180 s, depending on thickness and batter type. Waffles should be fully baked and golden brown but not burnt. To decrease product loss, whether in the kitchen or in a factory, a waffle needs to be stable (not torn during takeoff). The ideal waffle should also have an even color throughout and not be crumbly. The perfect waffle is made of finely granulated wheat flour with low to medium protein content and low water adsorption capacity. The recommended pH value for waffle batter is from 6.1 to 6.5. High pH values can cause an increase in the browning reaction which causes an increase in the amount of batter residues on the waffle iron and therefore, more sticking.

Waffle batter temperature should be in the range of 21 to 26.6 degrees Celsius. If batter temperature is too high the batter forms clumps and sticks to the apparatus. Density and viscosity are also important aspects that have an effect on overall waffle quality. The recommended density of a waffle should be about 80–95 g/100 ml because it needs to be fluid enough to fill the whole plate of the waffle iron. Too stiff, and the dough's spreadability decreases. Too much liquid, and the batter runs right off the plate. Viscosity is influenced by density (higher the density the higher the viscosity) but in the case of waffles, the effect of CO2 gas is more prevalent. The more aeration, the stiffer the waffle gets and the more viscous it is (it becomes foam-like). Aeration is the major factor that determines viscosity in a recipe so overall, the higher the aeration, the lower the density, and the higher the viscosity. Recipes vary for different types of waffles. Usually, better air-filled batters contribute to softer, fluffier waffles but viscosity should remain lower in order to have sufficient spreadability. Softer waffles do not have a correlation with sticking behavior. Density and viscosity do not have effect on sticking or adhering properties.

Shelf stability and staling 
Mixing is a critical step in batter preparation since overmixing causes the gluten to develop excessively and create a batter with too high of a viscosity that is difficult to pour and does not expand easily. A thick batter that is difficult spreading in the baking iron has an increased water activity of around 0.85. The increased viscosity made it harder for water to evaporate from the waffle causing an increase in water activity (aw). The control waffles with a softer texture had a water activity of 0.74 after cooking. The aw is less because the softer texture allows the water to evaporate. With an increased storage time, waffle physical and textural properties changes regardless of the batter viscosity.  Aged waffles shrink because air bubbles leak out and the structure starts to condense. Hardness and viscosity also increases as time goes by. Aged waffle samples displayed a starch retrogradation peak that increased with storage time due to the fact that more crystalline structures were present. Starch retrogradation is mentioned previously in this paper. The enthalpy value for melting of starch crystals increased with storage time as well.

See also

 Krumkake
 Barquillo
 List of quick breads
 Moffle – a waffle prepared using mochi
 Pancake
 Pizzelle
 Potato waffle mainly found in the UK and Ireland, made from potato formed into a waffle iron shape
 Egg waffle

References

External links
 
 
 Waffle recipes in the Cookbook wikibook

Quick breads
Sweet breads
European cuisine
French cuisine
Belgian cuisine
 
Articles containing video clips
Dutch cuisine
Dutch words and phrases
Belgian inventions
American breakfast foods
Yeast breads